Skulduggery Pleasant: Mortal Coil is young adult and fantasy novel written by Irish playwright Derek Landy, published in September 2010. It is the fifth of the Skulduggery Pleasant series and sequel to Skulduggery Pleasant: Dark Days, marking the first time two novels in the series had been released in one year.

The story follows the sorcerer and detectives Valkyrie Cain and Skulduggery Pleasant as they struggle to protect a known killer from an unstoppable assassin, while Valkyrie quests to prevent her dark and murderous destiny, while the Remnants seek to fulfill it. The book would not see release in the US and Canada until 2018. HarperCollins Audio also publishes the unabridged CD sets of the books read by Rupert Degas.

Plot summary

After a brief meeting between the High Priest Auron Tenebrae, Cleric Vandameer Craven, and Solomon Wreath, it was decided that Valkyrie would be considered as The Death Bringer within the Necromancer community, however, further proof would be needed to be acquired. Wreath was given the task to use the previously captured Remnant to make it inhabit Finbar Wrong's body to read the future regarding Valkyrie.

Meanwhile, Skulduggery and Valkyrie were searching after Davina Marr, whom they held responsible for the destruction of the Irish Sanctuary. During their investigation, they discover that they were not the only ones looking for her. Shortly after they realize this, they encountered Tesseract, a highly skilled Russian assassin who was in the middle of a deadly chase after Marr. They were able to rescue her from him. Instead of giving her up to the authorities, they took her to Kenspeckle Grouse, as Skulduggery wanted to question her beforehand. While they had to give time to Kenspeckle to fix her, Valkyrie decided to visit the Echo Stone Gordon Edgley, as her uncertainty about her frightening future grew to drastic measures. After a long discussion with Gordon, he advised her to visit a Banshee, in order to gain information about how to seal her True Name.

Solomon Wreath captured Finbar in order to force the Remnant into him and receive the information he wanted. While he could gather the information he thought to be valuable for the Necromancer community, the Remnant realized the importance of Valkyrie becoming Darquesse and thus providing a purpose for it to gather the others and gain control over her. Now fueled with its purpose, the Remnant broke away from Wreath and escaped in search for Anton Shudder's Midnight Hotel.

While Valkyrie is highly in doubt about her true nature as the destroyer of the world, she visits Caelan in order to ask him to taste her blood. If he did, it would mean he could tell Valkyrie what Dusk tasted or if there was anything "Special" about it. At first, Caelan refuses to help, stating he would: 'Tear her throat out'. He gives Valkyrie a penknife, instructing to cut herself and give him a small amount of blood. Once tasted, Caelan pretends to lose control, pushing her back against a tree. Instead of biting Valkyrie, he kisses her.

The Zombie King Vaurien Scapegrace was on the verge of falling apart, he was restlessly searching for a cure, which would help him to treat the downside of being a zombie. As he searches in vain, he acquires the location of Skulduggery's house, and takes his information to Roarhaven, where he was to sell it to the one who offers the information he needed. Among the auctioneers were Lightning Dave, Hokum Pete, Brobding, Hieronymus Deadfall, and unknown to them, Tesseract. While the former were keen to get the location, Tesseract eliminated each of them and gained the information he needed, and set to capture and kill Davina Marr.

Meanwhile, Anton Shudder is possessed by a remnant and frees all the remnants from the Midnight Hotel. Tesseract also attacks Skulduggery Pleasant and his friends, who have Davina Marr. After killing Marr, Tesseract returns to the Torment to collect a payment, only to be almost killed and buried alive by his collaborators Graft and Ceryen. Tesseract escapes, killing Graft and infiltrating the Sanctuary. He kills Ceryen but is attacked by the Torment and other Children of the Spider. During the fight, however, remnants attack the Sanctuary, and Tesseract is possessed.

At Christmas time, after a Christmas dinner where Valkyrie notices that Carol and Crystal have become nicer people, Valkyrie is taken to Dr Nye, who seals her True name. However, Nye double-crosses her and attempts to perform experiments on her, making Valkyrie threaten it with Necromancy. After explaining to Skulduggery that she is Darquesse, they find Scapegrace and bring him to Grouse to prevent his body from decaying. In Roarhaven, Finbar has been mentally disturbed by remnants and Solomon Wreath is possessed. At Bespoke Tailors, Skulduggery, Ghastly, and the others are attacked by Remnant-possessed Wreath with two other sorcerers, forcing them to retreat.

Valkyrie and Fletcher go dancing, but everyone in the nightclub is possessed by remnants. Valkyrie is forced to explain sorcery to Crystal and Carol in order to convince them to leave. At the Hibernian, the sorcerers all formulate a plan to activate the giant Soul-Catcher at MacGillicuddy's Reeks in order to capture all the remnants. Grouse also releases a harmless virus that makes people act like they are possessed in order to cover up the remnant outbreak. Valkyrie also shows the group Echo Stone Gordon to help. Skulduggery, meanwhile, plans to enter the new Sanctuary with a couple of sorcerers, but they fail and Skulduggery, the only one who cannot be possessed, escapes while the others are possessed.

During the search for the key to the Soul-Catcher, Tanith and Ghastly confess that they have feelings for each other. The key halves are recovered in a church and from a sorcerer. Fletcher is possessed at the Hibernian. Valkyrie is saved from Fletcher by Billy-Ray Sanguine, who also hints that he has feelings for Tanith too. Valkyrie searches for Kenspeckle, only to discover that Clarabelle has become possessed and has stabbed Kenspeckle to death. Valkyrie is saved from Fletcher by Caelan, who lets her leave with the group.

Skulduggery, Valkyrie, Ghastly, Tanith, China and Billy-Ray start driving to the Soul-Catcher, but China reveals she is possessed and attacks the group. Ghastly is possessed and Sanguine steals the key. However, Ghastly and the others possessed capture Valkyrie. At the Soul-Catcher, Valkyrie is possessed and is turned into Darquesse. She kills many people but is stopped by Skulduggery, who convinces her to destroy the remnant inside of her. The Soul-Catcher is turned on and all the remnants are sucked back in, except for Tesseract's, who possesses Tanith. Tanith then attacks Valkyrie and the others. Right before she hurts Valkyrie, Skulduggery shows up and she leaves.

At the Sanctuary, a new Council is chosen, with Erskine Ravel as the Grand Mage, and Ghastly and Madame Mist as the other Elders. Fletcher takes Valkyrie to Australia to apologize for his actions, but Valkyrie continues to be interested in Caelan. After the four-day period, by which time Tanith becomes permanently possessed, Tanith visits Valkyrie. She now has Billy-Ray as a boyfriend and tells Valkyrie that she slowly plans on leading her towards being Darquesse. The two then leave for Ohio.

At the end of the book, Tesseract breaks into the Torment's apartments and kills him. Skulduggery attempts to arrest Tesseract, but something appears and mortally wounds Tesseract. Skulduggery reveals that it was Lord Vile, who had returned to kill Valkyrie. Tesseract requests Skulduggery to take him outside to see the sunset. As the two sit on a bench, Tesseract dies trying to smile.

Characters

Valkyrie Cain

Skulduggery Pleasant

Tesseract
Tesseract is a highly skilled Russian assassin who was in the middle of a deadly chase after Davina Marr.

Remnants
Remnants are beings of pure anger, hatred and spite that dream of a world of death where they do not have to hide in "flesh suits", who worship Darquesse as their messiah.

Solomon Wreath
Solomon Wreath is Valkyrie's mentor in Necromancy. He is born in March,1619 and is 398 years old.  He is the most powerful cleric in the Irish necromancy temple and also the detective and representative there.  He sometimes works at the Sanctuary. He refuses to wear plain traditional necromancer robes and instead chooses stylish black suits.  His signature necromancy weapon is a black cane.  In Mortal Coil, he accidentally releases the Remnant that frees its brethren in an attempt to ascertain Valkyrie's future.

The Torment
The Torment is an ancient mage and leader of the Children of the Spider, residing in the town of Roarhaven.

Dr. Nye
Dr. Nye is a creature that assists Valkyrie in sealing her True Name.

Darquesse
Darquesse is the True Name of Valkyrie Cain, a being serving as her link to the source of magic, the Remnants' messiah, and the foretold cause of the end of the world.

Reviews

Skulduggery Pleasant: Mortal Coil has opened to largely positive reviews by critics.
 Bernice Harrison (The Irish Times):
The latest instalment in the Skulduggery series is everything Landy's fans have come to expect: tense, funny and – this is the crucial thing about the writer – magical[,] Landy is above all a superb storyteller with an imagination as full of glittering nuggets as King Solomon's Mines, and Mortal Coil is as thrilling, compelling and downright smart as its four predecessors.

 Alys Tandle (AlysTheBookWork.com)
[T]his book really deserves five stars, but it can't be read and understood without the others, so it only gets four. Sometimes I really dislike Derek Landy. He seems to punish my favourite characters the most, but I suppose that means that they're his favourites too.
 Joseph Melda (The Book Zone):
Derek Landy treats us to more nail biting scene after nail biting scene, some of which had me completely stumped as to how our heroes would escape death, or something worse, and as for the final climactic scene....... you will just have to read it for yourself, but I have a very strong feeling it will shock you.
 Rhys Wolfgang (ThirstForFiction):
Story-wise, Mortal Coil really steps up from Dark Days[, with] plenty of twists and turns[...] while keeping it short and not dragging on. The last few pages were incredibly cinematic, and I could visualise the credits rolling after I finished the last word.
 Scott Wilson (The Fringe Magazine):
[T]here isn't any lack of witty banter and humour in this book and I found myself laughing a lot despite the darker tone. Whether it's the genuine laugh out loud funny parts or just the one liners and conversation from Skulduggery and Valkyrie, there's plenty to make you laugh.

References

External links

Skulduggery Pleasant UK, Australia and New Zealand Official Website
Skulduggery Pleasant US and Canada Official Website

2010 Irish novels
Irish fantasy novels
Skulduggery Pleasant books
HarperCollins books
2010 children's books